Kaya is a common given name in several cultures.

Turkish name
Kaya Arıkoğlu (born 1949), American architect and urban designer
Kaya Erdem (born 1928), Turkish politician
Kaya Köstepen (1934–2011), Turkish footballer
Kaya Peker (born 1980), Turkish basketball player
Kaya Tarakçı (born 1981), Turkish footballer
Kaya Yanar (born 1973), German comedian

Japanese name
Kaya (Japanese musician), Japanese singer
, Japanese actress and model
, Japanese voice actress

Others
Kaya (Mauritian musician), Mauritian singer
Kaya Cattouse (born 1990), Belizean cyclist
Kaya Christian, American model
Kaya Forson (born 2002), Ghanaian swimmer
Kaya Henderson (born 1970), American educator, activist and civil servant
Kaya Jones (born 1984), American singer, model and actress
Kaya Malotana (born 1976), South African rugby union player
Kaya Oakes, American writer and poet
Kaya Scodelario (born 1992), English actress
Kaya Stewart (born 2000), American singer-songwriter
Kaya Thomas (born 1995), American computer scientist
Kaya Turski (born 1988), Canadian freestyle skier
Kaya Wittenburg (born 1972), American model, businessman and actor

See also

Kaia (name)
Kaja (name)
Kaya (surname)
Kaya (disambiguation)

Japanese feminine given names
Turkish masculine given names

cs:Kaja
de:Kaja
lt:Kaja
pl:Kaja